Erik Otrísal (born 28 June 1996) is a Slovak footballer who plays for TJ Sokol Lanžhot  as a defender.

Club career

FK Senica
He made his Fortuna Liga debut for Senica against Nitra on 31 May 2014.

References

External links
 
 Futbalnet profile
 FK Senica profile
 Eurofotbal profile

1996 births
Living people
People from Myjava
Sportspeople from the Trenčín Region
Slovak footballers
Slovakia youth international footballers
Slovak expatriate footballers
Association football defenders
FK Senica players
MFK Topvar Topoľčany players
FK Železiarne Podbrezová players
Slovak Super Liga players
2. Liga (Slovakia) players
3. Liga (Slovakia) players
Expatriate footballers in the Czech Republic
Slovak expatriate sportspeople in the Czech Republic